Allison Johnson (born 22 July 1963) is a Barbadian cricketer. He played in two first-class and three List A matches for the Barbados cricket team in 1988/89 and 1989/90.

See also
 List of Barbadian representative cricketers

References

External links
 

1963 births
Living people
Barbadian cricketers
Barbados cricketers
People from Saint Lucy, Barbados